Akkas Ali Miah is a Jatiya Party (Ershad) politician and the former Member of Parliament of Rajbari-1.

Career
Miah was elected to parliament from Rajbari-1 as a Jatiya Party candidate in 1986.

References

Jatiya Party politicians
Living people
3rd Jatiya Sangsad members
Year of birth missing (living people)